Peter F. Dicks (born 1942) is a London-based investment manager and venture capitalist. He was the co-founder of Abingworth PLC, one of the earlier venture capital funds in Europe.  He is also the former chairman of Sportingbet PLC, one of the world's largest sportsbooks. He is currently a committee vice-chairman with Mercia Fund Management.

Career
Early in his career, Dicks was a stock broker with Joseph Sebag & Co where he met Anthony Montagu. In 1973, Dicks and Montagu left Joseph Sebag and formed Abingworth PLC in London. Abingworth was one of the earlier venture capital firms formed in Europe.  Abingworth primarily invested in early-stage companies, specializing in technology start-up companies in the United States, and invested in such notable companies as Apple Computer, Silicon Graphics and 3COM.

Dicks has served as non-executive chairman or director of numerous companies and investment funds, but it was Dicks' tenure as non-executive chairman of Sportingbet PLC that earned him global notoriety.

Arrest 
On 7 September 2006 Mr Dicks was detained by U.S. Customs officials at New York City's John F. Kennedy International Airport. He was detained under an outstanding warrant issued by the state of Louisiana that charged Dicks with running a gambling enterprise by computer, a crime under Louisiana law.

His arrest came two months after the arrest of competitor David Carruthers, CEO of rival firm BetonSports. In contrast to Carruthers, who was being held on federal charges, Dicks was charged only with violating Louisiana law.

Dicks was released on $50,000 bail on 9 September. Shortly thereafter he tendered his resignation as Sportingbet chairman and fought his requested extradition to Louisiana. A hearing scheduled for 28 September 2006 was postponed until the following day to allow New York court officials time to reach a decision. 

On 29 September, Judge Lopez announced that the warrant would not be enforced, and that Dicks was free to return to the UK. New York governor George Pataki stated that because internet gambling is not a crime in New York, the state does not have the authority to extradite Dicks to Louisiana.

See also
NatWest Three
David Carruthers
Jay Cohen
Neteller
Nigel Payne
Gary Kaplan

Notes

External links
Sportingbet corporate site

1942 births
Living people
Businesspeople in the casino industry
British venture capitalists